Akhunovo (Axun) is a rural locality (a village) in Mechetlinsky Selsoviet, Salavatsky District, Bashkortostan, Russia. The population was 673 as of 2010. There are 5 streets.

Geography 
Akhunovo is located 19 km north of Maloyaz (the district's administrative centre) by road. Chulpan is the nearest rural locality.

References 

Rural localities in Salavatsky District